Alon Stein (born January 4, 1978) is an Israeli-German professional basketball coach and former player. He is currently working as assistant coach for Maccabi Rishon Lezion of the Israeli Premier League.

Biography
Alon Stein was born in Hadera, Israel. He scored 60 points at the State Youth Cup final  in 1992, when he was 14 years old.

Sports career
He played for the Israeli U22 National Team in 1996–98, alongside Oded Kattash.

His first professional team was Hapoel Galil Elyon, which he joined in 1995, at the age of 17. In 2011, Stein signed with Maccabi Tel Aviv.

On June 27, 2019, Stein was named Hapoel Hevel Modi'in new head coach.

References

External links
 Alon Stein at eurobasket.com
 Alon Stein at maccabi.co.il

1978 births
Living people
Amsterdam Basketball players
Eisbären Bremerhaven players
Elitzur Yavne B.C. players
Dutch Basketball League players
German men's basketball players
Hapoel Be'er Sheva B.C. players
Hapoel Galil Elyon players
Hapoel Tel Aviv B.C. players
Israeli basketball coaches
Israeli men's basketball players
Lions de Genève players
Maccabi Kiryat Motzkin basketball players
Maccabi Tel Aviv B.C. players
People from Hadera
Point guards
Ratiopharm Ulm players